This is a 'list of compositions by Johann Christian Bach.

The opus numbers are taken from Ernest Warburton's The Collected Works of Johann Christian Bach.JOHANN CHRISTIAN BACH

Keyboard works
W A1 \ Keyboard Sonata Op. 5 No.1 in B-flat major
W A2 \ Keyboard Sonata Op. 5 No.2 in D major
W A3 \ Keyboard Sonata Op. 5 No.3 in G major
W A4 \ Keyboard Sonata Op. 5 No.4 in E-flat major
W A5 \ Keyboard Sonata Op. 5 No.5 in E major
W A6 \ Keyboard Sonata Op. 5 No.6 in C minor
W A7 \ Keyboard Sonata Op. 17 No.1 in G major
W A8a \ Keyboard Sonata Op. 17 No.2 in C minor
W A8b \ Keyboard Sonata in C minor
W A9a \ Keyboard Sonata Op. 17 No.3 in E-flat major
W A9b \ Keyboard Sonata in E-flat major
W A10a \ Keyboard Sonata Op. 17 No.4 in G major
W A10b \ Keyboard Sonata in G major "A New Lesson"
W A11 \ Keyboard Sonata Op. 17 No.5 in A major
W A12 \ Keyboard Sonata Op. 17 No.6 in B-flat major
W A13 \ Keyboard Sonata in A minor
W A14 \ Keyboard Sonata in A-flat major
W A15 \ Toccata for keyboard in B-flat major
W A16 \ Keyboard Sonata in B-flat major
W A17 \ Keyboard Sonata (lost)
W A18 \ Sonata for keyboard 4-hands Op. 15 No.6 in C major
W A19 \ Sonata for keyboard 4-hands Op. 18 No.5 in A major
W A20 \ Sonata for keyboard 4-hands Op. 18 No.6 in F major
W A21 \ Sonata for 2 keyboards Op. 15 No.5 in G major
W A22 \ March for keyboard in F major
W A23 \ Polonaise for keyboard in B-flat major
W A24 \ Minuet for keyboard in C minor
W A25 \ Minuet for keyboard in C major
W A26 \ Polonaise for keyboard in E-flat major
W A27 \ Aria for keyboard in A minor
W A28 \ Minuet for keyboard in D minor
W A29 \ Minuet and trio for keyboard in G minor
W A30 \ Minuet and trio for keyboard in C major
W A31 \ Minuet for keyboard in C major

Chamber music
W B1 \ Piece for harp (lost)
W B2 \ Sonata for keyboard & violin Op. 10 No.1 in B-flat major
W B3 \ Sonata for keyboard & violin Op. 10 No.2 in C major
W B4 \ Sonata for keyboard & violin Op. 10 No.3 in G major
W B5 \ Sonata for keyboard & violin Op. 10 No.4 in A major
W B6a \ Sonata for keyboard & violin Op. 10 No.5 in F major
W B6b \ Sonata for viola da gamba in F major
W B7 \ Sonata for keyboard & violin Op. 10 No.6 in D major
W B8 \ Sonata for keyboard & violin Op. 15 No.3 in D major
W B9 \ Sonata for keyboard & violin Op. 15 No.4 in B-flat major
W B10 \ Sonata for keyboard & violin Op. 16 No.1 in D major
W B11 \ Sonata for keyboard & violin Op. 16 No.2 in G major
W B12 \ Sonata for keyboard & violin Op. 16 No.3 in C major
W B13 \ Sonata for keyboard & violin Op. 16 No.4 in A major
W B14 \ Sonata for keyboard & violin Op. 16 No.5 in D major
W B15a \ Sonata for keyboard & violin Op. 16 No.6 in F major
W B15b \ Sonata for viola da gamba in F major
W B16 \ Sonata for keyboard & violin Op. 18 No.1 in C major
W B17 \ Sonata for keyboard & violin Op. 18 No.2 in D major
W B18 \ Sonata for keyboard & violin Op. 18 No.3 in E-flat major
W B19 \ Sonata for keyboard & violin Op. 18 No.4 in G major
W B20 \ Sonata for keyboard & violin No.1 in F major
W B21 \ Sonata for keyboard & violin No.2 in D major
W B22 \ Sonata for keyboard & violin No.3 in G major
W B23 \ Sonata for keyboard & violin No.4 in A major
W B24 \ Sonata for keyboard & violin No.5 in G major
W B25 \ Sonata for keyboard & violin No.6 in D major
W B26 \ Sonata for keyboard & violin No.7 in F major
W B27 \ Sonata for keyboard & violin in A major
W B28 \ Trio Sonata (lost)
W B29 \ Trio Sonata (lost)
W B30 \ Trio Sonata Op. 2 No.5 in D major
W B31 \ Trio Sonata Op. 2 No.2 in A major
W B32 \ Trio Sonata Op. 2 No.6 in C major
W B33 \ Trio Sonata Op. 2 No.4 in G major
W B34 \ Trio Sonata Op. 2 No.3 in E-flat major
W B35 \ Trio Sonata Op. 2 No.1 in B-flat major
W B36 \ Trio Sonata Op. 8 No.3 in D major
W B37 \ Trio Sonata Op. 8 No.1 in G major
W B38 \ Trio Sonata Op. 8 No.2 in E-flat major
W B39 \ Trio Sonata Op. 8 No.5 in B-flat major
W B40 \ Trio Sonata Op. 8 No.6 in F major
W B41 \ Trio Sonata Op. 8 No.4 in E major
W B42 \ Trio for 2 violins & cello in B-flat major
W B43 \ Keyboard Trio Op. 2 No.1 in F major
W B44 \ Keyboard Trio Op. 2 No.2 in G major
W B45 \ Keyboard Trio Op. 2 No.3 in D major
W B46 \ Keyboard Trio Op. 2 No.4 in C major
W B47a \ Keyboard Trio in A major (Milanese version)
W B47b \ Keyboard Trio Op. 2 No.5 in A major
W B48 \ Keyboard Trio Op. 2 No.6 in E-flat major
W B49 \ Keyboard Trio Op. 15 No.1 in C major
W B50 \ Keyboard Trio Op. 15 No.2 in A major
W B51 \ Quartet Op. 8 No.1 in C major
W B52 \ Quartet Op. 8 No.2 in D major
W B53 \ Quartet Op. 8 No.3 in E-flat major
W B54 \ Quartet Op. 8 No.4 in F major
W B55 \ Quartet Op. 8 No.5 in G major
W B56 \ Quartet Op. 8 No.6 in B-flat major
W B57 \ Flute Quartet in D major
W B58 \ Flute Quartet in C major
W B59 \ Flute Quartet in A major
W B60 \ Quartet in B-flat major
W B61 \ Quartet with 2 flutes Op. 19 No.1 in C major
W B62 \ Quartet with 2 flutes Op. 19 No.2 in D major
W B63 \ Quartet with 2 flutes Op. 19 No.3 in G major
W B64 \ Quartet with 2 flutes Op. 19 No.4 in C major
W B65 \ Quartet with 2 oboes (lost)
W B66 \ Keyboard Quartet in G major
W B67 \ Keyboard Quartet (lost)
W B68 \ Keyboard Quartet (lost)
W B69 \ Keyboard Quartet (lost)
W B70 \ Quintet Op. 11 No.1 in C major
W B71 \ Quintet Op. 11 No.2 in G major
W B72 \ Quintet Op. 11 No.3 in F major
W B73 \ Quintet Op. 11 No.4 in E-flat major
W B74 \ Quintet Op. 11 No.5 in A major
W B75 \ Quintet Op. 11 No.6 in D major
W B76 \ Keyboard Quintet Op. 22 No.1 in D major
W B77 \ Keyboard Quintet Op. 22 No.2 in F major
W B78 \ Sextet for winds, strings & keyboard in C major
W B79 \ Military Quintet No.1 in E-flat major
W B80 \ Military Quintet No.2 in E-flat major
W B81 \ Military Quintet No.3 in B-flat major
W B82 \ Military Quintet No.4 in E-flat major
W B83 \ March of the regiment "Prinz von Ernst" in E-flat major
W B84 \ March of the regiment "Braunschweig" in E-flat major
W B85 \ March of the regiment "Württemberg" in E-flat major
W B86 \ March in E-flat major "zu Pferde"
W B87 \ March in E-flat major "zu Fuß"
W B88 \ March "vom ersten Bataillon Garde-Regiments in Hannover"
W B89 \ March "vom zweiten Bataillon Garde-Regiments in Hannover"
W B90 \ March in E-flat major
W B91 \ March in E-flat major
W B92 \ March in E-flat major
W B93 \ March in B-flat major
W BInc1 \ Sonata for guitar & violin in C major
W BInc2 \ Trio for 2 flutes & cello in G major
W BInc3 \ Trio for harp, violin & cello in B-flat major
W BInc4 \ Keyboard Quartet in A major
W BInc5 \ String Quintet in B-flat major
W BInc6 \ Divertimento (lost)
W BInc7 \ Symphony for winds No.1 in E-flat major
W BInc8 \ Symphony for winds No.2 in B-flat major
W BInc9 \ Symphony for winds No.3 in E-flat major
W BInc10 \ Symphony for winds No.4 in B-flat major
W BInc11 \ Symphony for winds No.5 in E-flat major
W BInc12 \ Symphony for winds No.6 in B-flat major

Orchestral works
W C1 \ Symphony Op. 3 No.1 in D major
W C2 \ Symphony Op. 3 No.2 in C major
W C3 \ Symphony Op. 3 No.3 in E-flat major
W C4 \ Symphony Op. 3 No.4 in B-flat major
W C5 \ Symphony Op. 3 No.5 in F major
W C6 \ Symphony Op. 3 No.6 in G major
W C7a \ Symphony Op. 6 No.1 in G major
W C7b \ Symphony in G major
W C8 \ Symphony Op. 6 No.2 in D major
W C9 \ Symphony Op. 6 No.3 in E-flat major
W C10 \ Symphony Op. 6 No.4 in B-flat major
W C11 \ Symphony Op. 6 No.5 in E-flat major
W C12 \ Symphony Op. 6 No.6 in G minor
W C13 \ Symphony Op. 8 No.2 in G major
W C14 \ Symphony Op. 8 No.3 in D major
W C15 \ Symphony Op. 8 No.4 in F major
W C16a \ Symphony in C major (Venier No.46)
W C16b \ Symphony in C major
W C17a \ Symphony in B-flat major
W C17b \ Symphony Op. 9 No.1 in B-flat major
W C18a \ Symphony in E-flat major
W C18b \ Symphony Op. 9 No.2 in E-flat major
W C19 \ Symphonie périodique in E-flat major
W C20 \ Symphony Op. 12 No.1 (lost)
W C21 \ Symphony Op. 12 No.2 (lost)
W C22 \ Symphony Op. 12 No.3 (lost)
W C23 \ Symphony Op. 12 No.4 (lost)
W C24 \ Symphony Op. 12 No.5 (lost)
W C25 \ Symphony Op. 12 No.6 (lost)
W C26 \ Symphony Op. 18 No.1 in E-flat major
W C27 \ Symphony Op. 18 No.4 in D major
W C28 \ Symphony Op. 18 No.5 in E major
W C29 \ Symphony a 6 (lost)
W C30 \ Overture a 6 (lost)
W C31 \ Symphony for double orchestra (lost)
W C32 \ Concertante for 2 violins & cello in G major
W C33 \ Concertante for 2 violins & oboe in E-flat major
W C34 \ Concertante for violin & cello in A major
W C35 \ Concertante for 2 violins in D major
W C36a \ Concertante for 2 violins & cello in C major
W C36b \ Concertante for 2 violins & cello in C major
W C37 \ Concertante for flute, oboe & bassoon in E-flat major
W C38 \ Concertante for oboe & bassoon in F major
W C39 \ Concertante for 2 flutes, 2 violins & cello in D major
W C40 \ Concertante for 2 oboes, 2 horns & string quintet in E-flat major
W C41 \ Concertante for flute, 2 clarinets, 2 horns & bassoon in E-flat major
W C42 \ Concertante for 2 violins & cello in E-flat major
W C43 \ Concertante for flute, oboe, violin & cello in C major
W C44 \ Concertante for flute, 2 violins & cello in E major
W C45 \ Concertante for oboe & string trio in G major
W C46 \ Concertante for violin & cello in B-flat major
W C47 \ Concertante for oboe, violin & 2 cellos (lost)
W C48 \ Concertante for piano, oboe, violin & cello in B-flat major
W C49 \ Keyboard Concerto Op. 1 No.1 in B-flat major
W C50 \ Keyboard Concerto Op. 1 No.2 in A major
W C51 \ Keyboard Concerto Op. 1 No.3 in F major
W C52 \ Keyboard Concerto Op. 1 No.4 in G major
W C53 \ Keyboard Concerto Op. 1 No.5 in C major
W C54 \ Keyboard Concerto Op. 1 No.6 in D major
W C55 \ Keyboard Concerto Op. 7 No.1 in C major
W C56 \ Keyboard Concerto Op. 7 No.2 in F major
W C57 \ Keyboard Concerto Op. 7 No.3 in D major
W C58 \ Keyboard Concerto Op. 7 No.4 in B-flat major
W C59 \ Keyboard Concerto Op. 7 No.5 in E-flat major
W C60a \ Keyboard Concerto Op. 7 No.6 in G major
W C60b \ Keyboard Concerto in G major
W C61 \ Keyboard Concerto Op. 14 in E-flat major
W C62 \ Keyboard Concerto Op. 13 No.1 in C major
W C63 \ Keyboard Concerto Op. 13 No.2 in D major
W C64 \ Keyboard Concerto Op. 13 No.3 in F major
W C65 \ Keyboard Concerto Op. 13 No.4 in B-flat major
W C66 \ Keyboard Concerto Op. 13 No.5 in G major
W C67 \ Keyboard Concerto Op. 13 No.6 in E-flat major
W C68 \ Harpsichord Concerto No.1 in B-flat major
W C69 \ Harpsichord Concerto No.2 in F minor
W C70 \ Harpsichord Concerto No.3 in D minor
W C71 \ Harpsichord Concerto No.4 in E major
W C72 \ Harpsichord Concerto No.5 in G major
W C73 \ Harpsichord Concerto No.6 in F minor
W C74 \ Concerto "nach Tartinis Manier" (lost)
W C75 \ Piano Concerto in E-flat major
W C76 \ Violin Concerto in C major
W C78 \ Flute Concerto in G major
W C79 \ Flute Concerto in D major
W C80 \ Oboe Concerto No.1 in F major
W C81 \ Oboe Concerto No.2 in F major
W C82 \ Bassoon Concerto in E-flat major
W C83 \ Bassoon Concerto in B-flat major
W C84 \ Minuet for Her Majesty's Birthday in F major
W C85 \ Minuet for Her Majesty's Birthday in C major
W CInc1 \ Symphony in B-flat major
W CInc2 \ Symphony in D major
W CInc3 \ Symphony in E-flat major
W CInc4 \ Symphony in F major
W CInc5 \ Concertante for flute, 2 violins & cello in G major
W CInc6 \ Harpsichord Concerto in E major
W CInc7 \ Violin Concerto (lost)
W CInc8 \ Flute Concerto in D major (lost)
W CInc9 \ A Favorite Minuet in E-flat major

Oratorios
W D1 \ Gioas, re di Giuda
W DInc1 \ Chorus for Piccinni's The Death of Abel (lost)
W DInc2 \ Choruses for Pergolesi's Stabat Mater'' (lost)

Liturgical works
W E1 \ Kyrie in D major (lost)
W E2 \ Kyrie in D major
W E3 \ Gloria in D major
W E4 \ Gloria in G major
W E5 \ Credo in C major
W E6 \ Invitatorium in F major
W E7 \ Lectio del officio per gli morti I
W E8 \ Lectio del officio per gli morti II
W E9 \ Lectio del officio per gli morti III
W E10 \ Miserere in B flat major
W E11 \ Ingresso e Kyrie della Messa de Morti in C minor
W E12 \ Dies Irae in C minor
W E13 \ Domine ad adjuvandum in D major
W E14 \ Domine ad adjuvandum in G major
W E15 \ Dixit Dominus in D major
W E16 \ Confitebor tibi Domine in E flat major
W E17 \ Beatus vir in F major
W E18 \ Laudate pueri in E major
W E19 \ Laudate pueri in G major
W E20 \ Magnificat a 8 in C major (unfinished)
W E21 \ Magnificat a 8 in C major
W E22 \ Magnificat a 4 in C major
W E23 \ Salve Regina in E flat major
W E24 \ Salve Regina in F major
W E25 \ Tantum ergo in F major
W E26 \ Tantum ergo in G major
W E27 \ Te Deum a 8 in D major (incomplete)
W E28 \ Te Deum a 4 in D major

Sacred works
W F1 \ Pater Noster a 8 (lost)
W F2 \ Attendite mortales in A minor
W F3 \ Larvae tremendae in D major
W F4a \ Si nocte tenebrosa in G minor "for Raaf"
W F4b \ Si nocte tenebrosa in G minor "for Pompili"
W F5 \ Let the solemn organs blow in D major
W FInc1 \ Motet a 2 (lost)
W FInc2 \ Motet a 3 (lost)

Operas and incidental music
W G1 \ Artaserse
W G2 \ Catone in Utica
W G3 \ Alessandro nell'Indie
W G4 \ Orione, ossia Diana vendicata
W G5 \ Zanaïda
W G6 \ Adriano in Siria
W G7 \ Carattaco
W G8 \ Temistocle
W G9 \ Lucio Silla
W G10 \ La clemenza di Scipione
W G11 \ Cantata a tre voci
W G12 \ Galatea (lost)
W G13 \ Cantata (lost)
W G14 \ Serenata (lost)
W G15 \ Endimione
W G16 \ La tempesta
W G17 \ O Venere vezzosa
W G18 \ Amor vincitore
W G19 \ Cefalo e Procri
W G20 \ Rinaldo ed Armida (lost)
W G21 \ Demofoonte
W G22 \ La Giulia
W G23 \ Gli Uccelatori
W G24 \ Il tutore e la pupilla
W G25 \ Astarto, re di Tiro
W G26 \ La cascina
W G27 \ La calamita de' cuori
W G28 \ L'Olimpiade
W G29 \ Orfeo ed Euridice (London, 1770)
W G30 \ Aria (lost)
W G31 \ Aria (lost)
W G32 \ Aria (lost)
W G33 \ Aria cantabile (lost)
W G34 \ Vo solcando un mar crudele in D major
W G35 \ Sventurata in van mi lagno in E flat major
W G36a \ Perchè si ingrata, oh Dio! in E flat major
W G36b \ Ah che gli stessi numi...Cara ti lascio
W G37 \ A si barbaro colpo...Morte, vieni
W G38 \ Scena di Berenice (lost)
W G39 \ Amadis de Gaule
W G40 \ Omphale (lost)
W G41 \ Happy Morn, auspicious rise
W G42 \ The Fairy Favour (lost)
W G43 \ The Maid of the Mill
W G44 \ The Summer's Tale
W G45 \ The Genius of Nonsense (lost)
W GInc1 \ Cantata (lost)
W GInc2 \ Emira
W GInc3 \ Gli equivoci
W GInc4 \ Qualor da un galantuomo in B flat major
W GInc5 \ Coeurs sensibles in B flat major
W GInc6 \ Ode on the arrival of Queen Charlotte
W GInc7 \ Menalcas
W GInc8 \ Pharnaces (lost)
W GInc9 \ Amintas (lost)

Arias and songs
W H1 \ Mezendore
W H2 \ Der Weise auf dem Lande
W H3 \ So fliehst du mich (lost)
W H4 \ Canzonetta: Io lo so, che il bel sembiante
W H5 \ Canzonetta: Trova un sol, mia bella Clori
W H6 \ Canzonetta: Che ciascun per te sospiri
W H7 \ Canzonetta: Chi mai di questo core
W H8 \ Canzonetta: Ascoltami, o Clori
W H9 \ Canzonetta: Lascia ch'io possa, o Nice
W H10 \ Canzonetta: Parlami pur sincera
W H11 \ Canzonetta: Eccomi alfin disciolto
W H12 \ Canzonetta Op. 4 No.1: Già la notte s'avvicina
W H13 \ Canzonetta Op. 4 No.2: Ah rammenta, o bella Irene
W H14 \ Canzonetta Op. 4 No.3: Pur nel sonno almen talora
W H15 \ Canzonetta Op. 4 No.4: T'intendo si, mio cor
W H16 \ Canzonetta Op. 4 No.5: Che ciascun per te sospiri
W H17 \ Canzonetta Op. 4 No.6: Ascoltami, o Clori
W H18 \ Canzonetta Op. 6 No.1: Torna in quell'onda chiara
W H19 \ Canzonetta Op. 6 No.2: Io lo so, che il bel sembiante
W H20 \ Canzonetta Op. 6 No.3: E pur fra le tempeste
W H21 \ Canzonetta Op. 6 No.4: Trova un sol, mia bella Clori
W H22 \ Canzonetta Op. 6 No.5: Chi mai di questo core
W H23 \ Canzonetta Op. 6 No.6: Se infida tu mi chiami
W H24 \ Vauxhall Song: By my sighs you may discover
W H25 \ Vauxhall Song: Cruel Strephon, will you leave me
W H26 \ Vauxhall Song: Come Colin, pride of rural swains
W H27 \ Vauxhall Song: Ah, why shou'd love with tyrant
W H28 \ Vauxhall Song: In this shady blest retreat
W H29 \ Vauxhall Song: Smiling Venus, Goddess dear
W H30 \ Vauxhall Song: Tender Virgins, shun deceivers
W H31 \ Vauxhall Song: Lovely yet ungrateful swain
W H32 \ Vauxhall Song: When chilling winter hies away (lost)
W H33 \ Vauxhall Song: Midst silent shades and purling streams
W H34 \ Vauxhall Song: Ah seek to know what place detains
W H35 \ Vauxhall Song: Would you a female heart inspire
W H36 \ Vauxhall Song: Cease a while ye winds to blow
W H37 \ Vauxhall Song: See the kind indulgent gales
W H38 \ Vauxhall Song: Oh how blest is the condition
W H39 \ Vauxhall Song: Hither turn thy wand'ring eyes
W H40 \ Vauxhall Finale: Ode to Pleasure (lost)
W H41 \ Vauxhall Finale: Ode to Summer (lost)
W H42 \ Vauxhall Finale: The Pastoral Invitation (lost)
W H43 \ Neptune
W HInc1 \ Song(s) with unknown text(s) (lost)
W HInc2 \ Canzonetta: Se tu m'ami, se sospiri

Miscellaneous works
W I1 \ Polonaise for keyboard in D minor
W I2 \ Fughettas for organ (lost)
W I3 \ Cadenzas for the concerto Op. 7 No.5 in E flat major

Arrangements of other composers' works
W LA1 \ Concerto for harpsichord solo No.1 in C major
W LA2 \ Concerto for harpsichord solo No.2 in E flat major
W LA3 \ Concerto for harpsichord solo No.3 in C major
W LAInc1 \ Overture in D major
W LG1 \ Orfeo ed Euridice (Naples, 1774)
W LG2 \ Ebben si vada...Io ti lascio in A major
W LG3 \ Mi scordo i torti...Dolci aurette in E flat major
W LG4 \ Sentimi non partir...Al mio bène in E flat major
W LG5 \ Infelice in van...Là nei regni in A major
W LH1 \ The Braes of Ballenden
W LH2 \ The Broom of Cowdenknows
W LH3 \ I'll never leave thee
W LH4 \ Lochaber
W LH5 \ The yellow-hair'd Laddie (lost)
W LHInc1 \ Not on beauty's transient pleasure

Arrangements of J.C. Bach's works by other composers
W XC 1 \ Symphony Op. 18 No.6 in D major

Attributed and spurious works
W YA28 \ Sonata for keyboard 4-hands in D major
W YA29 \ Sonata for keyboard 4-hands in G major
W YA30 \ Sonata for keyboard 4-hands in C major
W YA50 \ Fugue on BACH for organ in F major
W YB22 \ Violin Sonata Op. 20 No.2 in D major
W YB43 \ Trio for flute or violin, violin & continuo in B flat major
W YB47 \ Trio for flute, flute or violin & cello in C major
W YC90 \ Keyboard Concerto in E flat major
W YC91 \ Keyboard Concerto in A major
W YLA3 \ Keyboard Sonata in D major

References

External links
 
 Flute sonatas, W. B 10-15, 1780 edition (From the Sibley Music Library Digital Scores Collection)

Bach, Johann Christian